Zoti are wedding songs sung during the preparation of food during weddings in Goa, India.

See also

References

Indian styles of music

Goan music